Dustards is the first Ukrainian feature-length documentary film about motorcycle travel to Western Ukraine. The film premiered in November 2016.

About the film 
The story takes place in summer 2015, when four friends and a small film crew go on a journey to explore the Carpathian region.

The film was produced and launched by the company Red Glass Production known promotional shots for famous brands and collaborations with artists such as Pianoboy, O.Torvald, LOBODA and others. This is the first film project which engaged a team of Red Glass.

Awards 
 2017 — Platinum award / International Independent Film Festival (Los Angeles)
 2017 — Best documentary / London Independent Film Awards
 2017 — Remi Award / Worldfest — Houston International Film Festival
 2017 — Berlin International Filmmaker Festival of the World 2017 - Official selection

References

External links 
 

2016 films
Documentary films about road transport
Ukrainian documentary films
Motorcycling films